The Flirtations were a pro-LGBT, male a cappella musical group active from 1988 to 1997. The original members were Jon Arterton, Michael Callen, Aurelio Font, TJ Myers, and Cliff Townsend. On the Out On the Road album they were joined by Jimmy Rutland. For the album Three, the two surviving men, Jon Arterton and Jimmy Rutland, were joined by the woman, Suede.

Their music provided an opportunity for both a celebration of gay culture and a call to arms in the battle against AIDS and homophobia. They were fronted by the gay activist Michael Callen from establishment in 1988 until his death from AIDS-related disease in 1993. The Flirtations performed at a number of prominent national venues, and performed a song in the soundtrack to Philadelphia.

Discography
1990: The Flirtations

1994: Live: Out on the Road
1996: Three 

The Flirtations contributed one cut each to the following collections:

1992: Feeding The Flame: Songs By Men to End AIDS (The Flirt Song - by The Flirtations - Track 8 and Crazy World - by Michael Callen - Track 9)
1995: A love worth fighting for A celebration of gay and lesbian singers and songwriters, Volume one. (Angels, Punks And Raging Queens - The Flirtations - Track 12)
1995: Winter moon. A celebration of gay and lesbian singers and songwriters and friends, Volume two. (Do Not Turn Away - Michael Callen - Track 8 and Everything Possible - The Flirtations - Track 14)

References

Further reading and viewing
 Jones, Matthew J., The Boys in the Girl Group: The Flirtations and the Queer Politics of A Cappella.
.
Youtube Playlist of Flirtations and Michael Callen Videos

 KATHLEEN MEGAN, THE HARTFORD COURANT, KEEPING THE `SPIRIT' ALIVE, April 23, 2007

LGBT-themed musical groups
American pop music groups
Musical groups established in 1988
Musical groups disestablished in 1997